Saint-Ybard is a commune in the Corrèze department in central France.

Population

See also
Communes of the Corrèze department

References

External links

Official site

Communes of Corrèze
Corrèze communes articles needing translation from French Wikipedia